Dagudu Moothalu is a 1964 Indian Telugu-language comedy film produced by D. B. Narayana and directed by Adurthi Subba Rao, who also wrote the screenplay. Based on a story by Mullapudi Venkata Ramana, it stars N. T. Rama Rao and B. Saroja Devi. In Dagudu Moothalu, the distant relatives of an ailing man attempt to usurp his wealth, while making sure that his grandson, the rightful heir, does not inherit the said wealth.

Ramana took plot details of the 1936 American film Mr. Deeds Goes to Town – the title character inheriting a huge property and subsequently being branding a lunatic by miscreants who are after his wealth – but then wrote a story creating new characters and situations, Dagudu Moothalu. The film was released on 21 August 1964, and became a commercial success. It was later remade in Tamil as Avan Pithana? (1966) and in Hindi as Jwaar Bhata (1973).

Plot 
Vishwasundara Rao is an affluent, but ailing gentleman. He deserts his son who marries without the former's consent. By the time Vishwasundara Rao realises what he did, he loses his son and daughter-in-law. The couple's son Sundarayya is raised as an orphan despite being the grandson of a rich family. He earns his living by establishing a coffee hotel in the same town as his grandfather.

Vishwasundara Rao's distant relatives, Bhushanam and Sooramma, plot to usurp his wealth while under the guise of serving him. Bhushanam supports Sooramma's plan to make Viswasundara Rao adopt her son Paparao on the condition that she perform his daughter Ammadu's marriage with Paparao.

Subbulu, a young woman, escapes from her house to avoid an unwanted wedding. She takes shelter in Sundarayya's house, and both fall in love. After some days, Subbulu gets a job to take care of Vishwasundarayya in his bungalow. She finds photos of Sundarayya's parents in the bedroom and realises that Sundarayya is the grandson of Vishwasundara Rao. She brings the grandfather-grandson together. Vishwasundara Rao sadly dies after looking at his grandson.

With their plans having been botched, Bhushanam decides to frame Sundarayya as a lunatic. However, the truth soon comes out, and Sooramma, Bhushanam and his aide Siddhanthi are convicted for their actions. Sundarayya marries Subbulu, and Paparao marries Ammadu.

Cast 
N. T. Rama Rao as Sundara Rao Jr. "Sundarayya"
B. Saroja Devi as Subba Lakshmi "Subbulu"
Gummadi as Viswasundara Rao
Ramana Reddy as Bhushanam
Padmanabham as Papayi
Allu Ramalingaiah as Siddhanthi Gavarayya
Suryakantham as Sooramma
Sharada as Ammadu
Raavi Kondala Rao as the family doctor
Radha Kumari as Bhushanam's wife

Production

Development 
In 1962, producer D. B. Narayana of D. B. N. Productions assigned Mullapudi Venkata Ramana to write the story and dialogues for his next production, which would star N. T. Rama Rao. Ramana took plot details of the 1936 American film Mr. Deeds Goes to Town – the title character inheriting a huge property and subsequently being branding a lunatic by miscreants who are after his wealth – and wrote a story creating new characters and situations, Dagudu Moothalu. Adurthi Subba Rao was hired to direct, and wrote the screenplay based on Ramana's story. Cinematography was handled by P. L. Roy, and editing by T. Krishna.

Casting and filming 
N. T. Rama Rao was cast as the male lead Sundarayya, and Dagudu Moothalu was his first film under Adurthi's direction. B. Saroja Devi was cast as the female lead Subbulu, and was paid . Raavi Kondala Rao played the family doctor, thereby making his entry as a professional actor. During the shoot, Saroja Devi had a ligament tear; because of this, the sets which were constructed for filming the songs "Mella Mella Mellaga" and "Adagaka Icchina Manase" in Vauhini Studios had to be dismantled, leading to escalated costs and production delays. Distraught, Adurti rushed to Saroja Devi's Bangalore home, and was ready to replace her with Krishna Kumari, but realised her condition was worse than they had imagined. The songs were eventually filmed around Lal Bagh, Ulsoor Lake and Cubbon Park.

Soundtrack 
The soundtrack was composed by K. V. Mahadevan.

Release and reception 
Dagudu Moothalu was released on 21 August 1964, with Navayuga Films acquiring the distribution rights. The film was commercially successful, and was later remade in Tamil as Avan Pithana? (1966) and in Hindi as Jwaar Bhata (1973).

References

Bibliography

External links 
 

1960s Telugu-language films
1964 comedy films
1964 films
Films directed by Adurthi Subba Rao
Films scored by K. V. Mahadevan
Indian comedy films
Telugu films remade in other languages